Larry Bimi (died 23 July 2011) was a Ghanaian lawyer and public official.

History
He was born in Bimbagu in the Bunkpurugu-Yunyoo District of the Northern Region.

Public life
He practiced as a lawyer in Ghana till he was called to chair the National Commission for Civic Education in 2009. As chairman of the commission he supervised the education people on their democratic rights and obligations.

Death
Mr. Bimi died at the Korle-Bu Teaching Hospital on 23 July 2011 after a short illness.

References

20th-century Ghanaian lawyers
Ghanaian politicians
2011 deaths
Year of birth missing
21st-century Ghanaian lawyers